Miglos is a commune in the Ariège department in southwestern France.

Geography
It is located in the former High Ariege in the High County Foix, Sabarthès.

The valley opens to the northwest Vicdessos valley at Capoulet, and to the south it forms a large bowl.

The limits of the Barony under the former regime were almost the same as those of today. During the revolutionary period the municipality escaped fragmentation.

Population

Sights

It was built towards the beginning of the 13th century, later razed by order of Cardinal Richelieu and largely damaged at the time of the French Revolution.

In 1830, Jean-Louis Hycinthe de Vendômois, heir to the place, saw his residence plundered during the Guerre des Demoiselles (1829–1832) while opposing the peasants of Ariège with Charles X of France.

See also
Communes of the Ariège department

References

External links

Communes of Ariège (department)
Ariège communes articles needing translation from French Wikipedia